Sunčane Skale 2015 was the 21st and the final edition of Sunčane Skale, an annual pop festival held in Montenegro.

Results

Nove zvijezde

Scoreboard 

For the first time, there was a Facebook online voting. The song that got most Likes got 12 points.

Jury members:
 Facebook voting - Boris Milivojević
 - ?
 - ?
 - Aleksandar Belov
 - Bojan Delić
 - ?
 - Elena Petreska
 - ?
 - Saša Mirković
 - Isa Melikov
 - Dušica Jakovljević
 - ?
 - Vanna
 - Anita Popović

References

External links 

Sunčane Skale
2015 in Montenegro